Highlander II: The Quickening is a 1991 science fiction film directed by Russell Mulcahy and starring Christopher Lambert, Virginia Madsen, Michael Ironside and Sean Connery. It is the second installment in the Highlander film series, and sequel of the 1986 fantasy film Highlander. Set in the year 2024, the plot concerns Connor MacLeod, who regains his youth and immortal abilities and must free Earth from the Shield, an artificial ozone layer that has fallen under the control of a corrupt corporation. The film was shot almost entirely in Argentina before and after the country's economy crashed; as the local economy experienced hyperinflation, the film's investors and completion bond company took direct control of production and final edit, removing director Mulcahy and his creative influence while changing parts of the story. The resulting film contradicts the established canon of Highlander, in depicting immortals as aliens, featuring the inexplicable resurrection of Juan Sánchez-Villalobos Ramírez, and altering the concept of the "Quickening".

It received universally negative reviews from critics and fans of the series, with many considering it to be one of the worst films ever made. It was universally panned for its retcons, large plot holes, poorly developed characters, confusing story structure, an abundance of subplots, and bad editing. The original theatrical edition was released on 12 April 1991 in the United Kingdom (in an eight-minute longer cut) and 1 November 1991 in the United States, and was also a box-office bomb grossing $16 million in the US on a production budget of $34 million.

In 1995, an alternate director's cut called the Renegade Version was released to home video that attempted to address the many story problems, such as removing all mention of Zeist and the idea that immortals are aliens. This was followed by a Special Edition DVD release in 2004, which was largely the same cut as the Renegade Version but with some altered special effects. The sequel Highlander III: The Sorcerer follows the events of the first film, in the process contradicting and completely ignoring the events and revelations of Highlander II.

Plot
In the 1990s, industrial pollution has destroyed Earth's ozone layer, leading to millions of deaths due to the sun's unfiltered rays. By 1999, MacLeod supervises a scientific team headed by Dr. Allan Neyman who create an electromagnetic shield to protect the Earth from radiation. The shield saves the Earth, but with a side-effect of condemning the planet to constant darkness, high temperatures and humidity. The shield falls under the control of the corrupt Shield Corporation and its chief executive David Blake, who imposes heavy fees on countries for continued protection from solar radiation. 

In 2024, Connor MacLeod, now mortal, is a frail old man. While watching an opera performance, he has a flashback from five hundred years ago on the immortals' distant home planet of Zeist. MacLeod was chosen by Juan Sánchez-Villalobos Ramírez, a wise Zeist sorcerer, to lead a rebellion against the corrupt leadership of General Katana. Using the Quickening, Ramírez creates a bond between him and MacLeod that cannot be broken even by death. Katana and his troops then attack, crushing the rebellion and imprisoning Macleod and Ramirez. The latter two are put on trial by priests, before being exiled to Earth to live as immortals. Locked into ageless lives, they will fight each other until there is only one left. The survivor will win the Prize: a choice to either remain on Earth as a mortal or return to Zeist, their past crimes forgiven.

Awakening from his flashback MacLeod is approached by Louise Marcus, leader of an anti-shield group. Louise has uncovered the possibility that the ozone layer has returned to normal and that The Shield Corporation are keeping its restoration quiet to maintain revenue. Louise asks MacLeod to help her take down the shield, but he refuses, replying that he is too old and disapproves of terrorism. Meanwhile on Zeist, General Katana decides to have MacLeod killed and sends assassins Corda and Reno to Earth to kill him. MacLeod defeats Reno and Corda, and uses their quickenings to regain his youth and summon Ramírez back to life.

Ramírez materializes where he had died in Glencoe, Scotland. Drawn to MacLeod's location, his earring is apparently worth enough money to buy a new suit of clothes and a plane ticket to New York. General Katana also arrives on Earth, determined to kill MacLeod himself. After Ramírez finds MacLeod and Louise, the three make a plan to take down the shield.

Katana approaches the Shield Corporation and creates an uneasy alliance with David Blake to kill MacLeod. When it is discovered that Neyman has revealed proof the ozone layer has healed to MacLeod, Blake has Neyman imprisoned. MacLeod, Ramírez and Marcus break into the prison, but Neyman dies and Ramírez sacrifices his life to save MacLeod and Marcus from a trap. Katana kills Blake and MacLeod has one final confrontation with Katana. After winning the fight and decapitating Katana, MacLeod uses the combined quickening energy to disable the shield, and the world begins to see a night sky for the first time.

Cast

Production
Although the film originally began after the success of the original, Davis/Panzer Productions presold most of the rights of the Highlander sequel to Vestron Inc. for $18 million, namely in five foreign territories, such as the United Kingdom, Scandinavia, Australia, Japan and Benelux, while Vestron would handle French home video distribution, Filmauro gained Italian rights to the project, Highlight Communications gained German rights to the film, Nea Kinisi for the Greece market and Lusomondo for the Portugal market, and the producers concluded other presells were available for the Argentina, Peru and Bolivia markets, and in the U.S., set to be released by New Century/Vista Film Co., which was intended for the summer of 1988, but it was landed in development hell.

The sets of Highlander II have been compared to those of Ridley Scott, particularly those of Blade Runner. Lambert and Ironside both suffered injuries during the filming, according to the St. Petersburg Times: "Lambert chipped one of Ironside's teeth during a fight scene, while Ironside inadvertently chopped off part of Lambert's finger during a swordfight scene. Both men recovered from their injuries, but Ironside said precision thrusts and parries were impossible when wielding a 22-pound broadsword."

John C. McGinley made his character's voice as deep as possible in an effort to sound like Orson Welles. He has since admitted that this was a bad idea.

According to the documentary Highlander II: Seduced by Argentina, the film's apparent poor performance is partially a result of the bonding company's interference with the work of the director, Russell Mulcahy. Mulcahy reportedly hated the final product so much he walked out of the film's world premiere, reportedly doing so after viewing its first 15 minutes. For similar reasons, Christopher Lambert threatened to walk out of the project when it was nearing fruition. However, due to contractual obligations, he did not.

The film's investors and completion bond company took direct control of production and final edit, removing director Mulcahy and his creative influence while changing parts of the story. The resulting film contradicts the established canon of Highlander regarding the nature of immortals and MacLeod's past, such as depicting immortals as aliens from the planet Zeist rather than human-born with energy connecting them to nature and making them unable to die unless beheaded. MacLeod's former mentor Ramírez, killed in the first film, is inexplicably resurrected and now depicted as an alien sorcerer. While the first film used the word "Quickening" to refer to the energy that gives an immortal their power, Highlander II uses the term to refer to a magical force Ramírez uses to bond his soul to MacLeod's, allowing him to return from death when the Highlander needs him.

Alternate ending
A once lost alternate ending, commonly known as The Fairytale Ending, was shown only in some European theaters and has never been shown in any of the American cuts. The ending shows Connor magically returning to planet Zeist, taking Louise along with him, while Ramírez’s voice is heard in the background. An early version of this ending is shown on the Special Edition. It also includes footage of Virginia Madsen as Louise Marcus speaking to Christopher Lambert as Connor MacLeod. Madsen is on location while Lambert is suspended by wires in front of a blue screen. After a brief exchange where Connor asks Louise to come with him, the theatrical ending is shown where the two embrace in front of a field of stars, then transform into light streaks and fly off into space.

Release

UK release
Highlander II: The Quickening was released in the UK on 12 April 1991 with a runtime of 100 minutes. This version was distributed by Entertainment Film Distributors and ran 8 minutes longer than the US cut.

As well as a very different scene order this version included additional footage not seen in the later US Theatrical release; including a flashback to the death of Connor's previous wife Brenda, a sequence of Connor and Louise going above the shield, and the alternate "Fairytale Ending" mentioned above.

Despite this longer version running in UK theatres, all home video releases in the country to date have been of the shorter 91-minute US Theatrical Release (running 86 minutes due to PAL speedup). This includes the rental VHS (EVV 1203), retail VHS (EVS 1072), laserdisc (PLFEB 37011), and DVD (EDV 9119).

United States release
Highlander II: The Quickening was released in the United States on 1 November 1991 with a runtime of 91 minutes, distributed by InterStar Releasing. This version was edited down by the bond company, with many scenes rearranged throughout. Despite the many cuts made to this version the bond company also added two new scenes that further fleshed out the villain, General Katana. These scenes include; Katana taunting Connor in his Zeist prison cell, and Connor and Katana meeting at the grave of Connor's dead wife, Brenda.

This version was released many times in the US, including on VHS, laserdisc, and Video8. All DVD and Blu-Ray releases of the film in the United States have been of the longer "Renegade" and "Special Edition" versions.

Marketing
A $1 million television advertising campaign was run for the release of the film.

Home media
In the United States, the theatrical cut was released on VHS on 13 May 1992 by Columbia TriStar Home Video, and was reissued on 13 April 1994 by Hemdale Home Video.

Alternate versions

UK and European theatrical release 

In the UK and European theatrical release, the opening segment includes a scene where Brenda Wyatt (Connor MacLeod's lover from the first film) is dying from solar radiation. She makes MacLeod promise to stop the ozone crisis before dying. Additional scenes include MacLeod and Marcus climbing through a tunnel to get above the Shield to find the ozone layer has returned to normal. The ending shows MacLeod returning to Zeist after destroying the Shield, bringing Louise with him (this has been dubbed by fans as the "fairy-tale ending").

Renegade Version 
In 1995, Mulcahy made a director's cut version known as the Renegade Version, which became the main version of the film available as the original theatrical cut did not have enough demand to warrant further production for home media. As a result, many fans in later years were only able to find the Renegade Version for viewing rather than the original theatrical release. The Renegade Version was reconstructed largely from existing material; certain scenes were removed and others added back in and entire sequences of events were changed. All references to the Immortals being aliens from another planet called Zeist were eliminated. New sequences include a battle between MacLeod and Katana atop a moving vehicle after they escape the security facility, and MacLeod and Louise climb through a mountain tunnel to emerge above the Shield to confirm that the radiation levels are back to normal (a scene previously only seen in the UK cut). The new version removes a major continuity gaffe from the theatrical version, which had merged two separate sword fights between MacLeod and Katana into one longer climactic battle. The director's cut version restores them to two separate battles, although it never shows how or when Connor reacquired his katana.

Special Edition 
Producers Panzer and Davis revisited Highlander II once again in 2004. Dubbed the "Special Edition", this cut was nearly identical to the Renegade Version, but with a few alterations, such as the introduction of new CGI special effects throughout the film, including a now-blue shield as originally intended, and a small piece of voice-over work by Lambert. As the original cut of the film is no longer distributed, many fans in later years have only had the Regenade Version and Special Edition available to watch.

Reviewing the 2004 "Special Edition" DVD, David Ryan of DVD Verdict gave it a score of 69 out of 100 and said that "[this] is the best version of this film that [the producers] can make with the material they have on hand. It's still not a particularly good film—but it's infinitely superior to the original version... What was once a horrible, horrible film has become downright tolerable, and actually somewhat entertaining at times."

Reception

Box office
The film was released months later in the US on 1 November 1991, and opened at #3, grossing $5.3 million in 960 theaters in the opening weekend. It grossed a total of $15.6 million in the US.

Critical response
Highlander II: The Quickening received negative reviews from critics, and is considered one of the worst films ever made. On review aggregator Rotten Tomatoes, the film has a rare approval rating of 0% based on 24 reviews, and an average rating of 2.7/10. The site's critics' consensus reads: "There should have been only one." On Metacritic, the film has a weighted average score of 31 out of 100 based on 14 critics, indicating "generally unfavorable reviews". Common criticisms included the lack of motivation for the characters, the new and seemingly incongruent origin for the Immortals, the resurrection of Ramírez, and apparent contradictions in the film's internal logic.

Roger Ebert of the Chicago Sun-Times gave the film a score of 0.5 stars (out of four), saying: "Highlander II: The Quickening is the most hilariously incomprehensible movie I've seen in many a long day—a movie almost awesome in its badness. Wherever science fiction fans gather, in decades and generations to come, this film will be remembered in hushed tones as one of the immortal low points of the genre … If there is a planet somewhere whose civilization is based on the worst movies of all time, Highlander 2: The Quickening deserves a sacred place among their most treasured artifacts." Ebert also mocked the Quickening, saying it looked like a person standing in a puddle had touched another person who had just stuck his finger into a light socket.

Alex Carter of Den of Geek wrote: «I started writing this to try and shed a different light on this unappreciated classic, but I can't. I really can't. Highlander II is awful. It's not even "so bad it's good" territory, it skips right past that into the "so awful you can't look away for fear you'll both be killed" territory. And amazingly, it manages to not only be contender for worst film in the world, but it also runs the entire franchise into the ground and retcons the first film into oblivion in the space of 15 minutes ... For decades, this was the punchline for every bad movie joke, the bad sequel to end all bad sequels. This is a film that wishes it could be as good as Santa Claus Conquers The Martians.» Giving the film a score of 2 out of 10, IGN's review of the Highlander 2: Renegade Version said: "How bad is this movie? Well, imagine if Ed Wood were alive today, and someone gave him a multi-million dollar budget. See his imagination running rampant, bringing in aliens from outer space with immensely powerful firearms, immortals who bring each other back to life by calling out their names, epic duels on flying skateboards, and a blatant disregard for anything logical or previously established—now you are starting to get closer to the vision of Highlander II."

Awarding the film one star out of five, Christopher Null of FilmCritic.com said, "Highlander has become a bit of a joke, and here's where the joke started... Incomprehensible doesn't even begin to explain it. This movie is the equivalent of the 'Hey, look over there!' gag. You look, and the guy you wanted to beat up has run away and hid."

Kevin Thomas of the Los Angeles Times gave the film a mixed review: "It makes clearer much that was so vague in the original; it even jokes about how confusing its premise is. In short, audiences who made the first film successful enough to warrant a second will be getting a bit more for their money."
David Nusair of Reel Film Reviews gave the film two stars out of four, saying: "It's hard to imagine Highlander II appealing to non-fans of the first film, as the film barely captures the sense of fun that was so prevalent in the original. With its complicated storyline and dreary visuals, it occasionally feels more perfunctory than anything else—though, to be fair, it's nowhere near as bad as it's been made out to be over the years."

See also
 List of films considered the worst

References

External links

 
 

1991 films
1990s action films
1991 fantasy films
1990s science fiction films
American fantasy films
American science fiction action films
American sequel films
1990s English-language films
Highlander (franchise) films
American dystopian films
Eco-terrorism in fiction
Environmental films
Films about extraterrestrial life
Films about terrorism
Films set in 1994
Films set in 1999
Films set in 2024
Films set in Scotland
Films set in the United States
Films set on fictional planets
Films shot in Argentina
Films shot in Buenos Aires
Films set in Spain
Films shot in Spain
Resurrection in film
Republic Pictures films
Films scored by Stewart Copeland
Films directed by Russell Mulcahy
Films produced by William N. Panzer
Films with screenplays by Peter Bellwood
InterStar Releasing films
Science fantasy films
Cyberpunk films
1990s American films